Dorthia Cottrell (born March 11, 1986) is an American singer for the doom metal band Windhand. She also has an acoustic solo career.

Discography

With Windhand 
Windhand (2012)
Soma (2013)
Grief's Infernal Flower (2015)
Eternal Return (2018)

Solo
Dorthia Cottrell (2015)

References

1986 births
Living people
American women heavy metal singers
21st-century American women